Nothing to Lose is a studio album by American country artist Margo Smith. It was released on January 5, 2005 via Lamon Records and contained ten tracks. The album was a mixture of country and Christian songs, some of which were composed by Smith herself. It was her first album released in nearly a decade and her first for the Lamon label.

Background, content and release
In the 1970s, Margo Smith became successful through a series of hits in the country field. Songs like "There I Said It" (1975), "Don't Break the Heart That Loves You" (1978), "Little Things Mean a Lot" (1978) and "Still a Woman" became major hits on the Billboard country singles chart. In later decades, Smith formed a Christian duo with her daughter and released a series of albums in the same format. Continuing to tour as both a country and Christian artist, she would release Nothing to Lose in 2005. The album contained a total of ten tracks, six of which were composed by Smith herself. This included the title track, "God Gave Me You" and "When You're Down to Nothing".

Nothing to Lose also contained four recordings composed by other songwriters. This included a cover of the Christian hymns, "At the Feet of Jesus," "Just a Closer Walk with Thee" and the Ray Stevens song "Everything Is Beautiful". The album was produced by musician Dave Moody and was recorded at dLab Studios. The project was released on January 5, 2005 via Lamon Records. It was offered as a compact disc and a music download. It was Smith's first studio album since 1993's Swiss, Cowboy and Country. It was also her eighteenth studio recording and first for Lamon Records.

Track listing

Personnel
All credits are adapted from AllMusic and the liner notes of Nothing to Lose.

Musical personnel
 Mylon Hayes – Bass, bass guitar
 Dave Johnson – Fiddle, harmonica, pedal steel guitar
 Allen Kerr – Drums
 Dave Moody – Acoustic guitar, electric guitar, dobro, guitar, mandolin
 Joshua Moody – Drums
 Rebecca Moody – Chorus
 Ron Murray – Vocal harmony
 Chris Lockhart Smith – Chorus
 Lisa Maria Smith – Chorus
 Margo Smith – Lead vocals
 Lewis Wells – Piano

Technical personnel
 Cody McSwain – Engineer
 Nelson McSwain – Audio production
 Dave Moody – Audio production, engineer, producer
 Joshua Moody – Percussion
 Hope Powell – Photography

Release history

References

2005 albums
Margo Smith albums